The Stokes number (Stk), named after George Gabriel Stokes, is a dimensionless number characterising the behavior of particles suspended in a fluid flow.  The Stokes number is defined as the ratio of the characteristic time of a particle (or droplet) to a characteristic time of the flow or of an obstacle, or

A particle with a low Stokes number follows fluid streamlines (perfect advection), while a particle with a large Stokes number is dominated by its inertia and continues along its initial trajectory.

In the case of Stokes flow, which is when the particle (or droplet) Reynolds number is less than unity, the particle drag coefficient is inversely proportional to the Reynolds number itself.  In that case, the characteristic time of the particle can be written as 
 

In experimental fluid dynamics, the Stokes number is a measure of flow tracer fidelity in  particle image velocimetry (PIV) experiments where very small particles are entrained in turbulent flows and optically observed to determine the speed and direction of fluid movement (also known as the velocity field of the fluid). For acceptable tracing accuracy, the particle response time should be faster than the smallest time scale of the flow. For , particles follow fluid streamlines closely. If , tracing accuracy errors are below 1%.

Relaxation time and tracking error in Particle Image Velocimetry 

The Stokes number provides a means of estimating the quality of Particle Image Velocimetry data sets, as previously discussed. However, a definition of a characteristic velocity or length scale may not be evident in all applications. Thus, a deeper insight of how a tracking delay arises could be drawn by simply defining the differential equations of a particle in the Stokes regime. A particle moving with the fluid at some velocity  will encounter a variable fluid velocity field as it advects. It is the difference between these velocities that will generate the drag force necessary to correct the particle path:

The stokes drag force is then:

The particle mass is:

Thus, the particle acceleration can be found through Newton's second law:

Note the relaxation time  can be replaced to yield:

The first-order differential equation above can be solved through the Laplace transform method:

Thus, the −3 dB gain (cut-off) frequency will be:

The cut-off frequency and the particle transfer function, plotted on the side panel, allows for the assessment of PIV error in unsteady flow applications and its effect on turbulence spectral quantities and kinetic energy.

Particles through a shock wave 

The bias error in particle tracking discussed in the previous section is evident in the frequency domain, but it can be difficult to appreciate in cases where the particle motion is being tracked to perform flow field measurements (like in particle image velocimetry). A simple but insightful solution to the above-mentioned differential equation is possible when the forcing function  is a Heaviside step function; representing particles going through a shockwave. In this case,  is the flow velocity upstream of the shock; whereas  is the velocity drop across the shock.

The step response for a particle is a simple exponential:

To convert the velocity as a function of time to a particle velocity distribution as a function of distance, let's assume a 1-dimensional velocity jump in the  direction. Let's assume  is positioned where the shock wave is, and then integrate the previous equation to get:

In practice, this means a shock wave would look, to a PIV system, blurred by approximately this  distance. 

Although a shock wave is the worst-case scenario of abrupt deceleration of a flow, it illustrates the effect of particle tracking error in PIV, which results in a blurring of the velocity fields acquired at the length scales of order .

Non-Stokesian drag regime 
The preceding analysis will not be accurate in the ultra-Stokesian regime. i.e. if the particle Reynolds number is much greater than unity. Assuming a Mach number much less than unity, a generalized form of the Stokes number was demonstrated by Israel & Rosner.

Where is the "particle free-stream Reynolds number",

An additional function  was defined by; this describes the non-Stokesian drag correction factor,

It follows that this function is defined by,

Considering the limiting particle free-stream Reynolds numbers, as  then  and therefore . Thus as expected there correction factor is unity in the Stokesian drag regime.

Where the constant . The conventional Stokes number will significantly underestimate the drag force for large particle free-stream Reynolds numbers. Thus overestimating the tendency for particles to depart from the fluid flow direction. This will lead to errors in subsequent calculations or experimental comparisons.

Application to anisokinetic sampling of particles 
For example, the selective capture of particles by an aligned, thin-walled circular nozzle is given by Belyaev and Levin as:

where  is particle concentration,  is speed, and the subscript 0 indicates conditions far upstream of the nozzle. The characteristic distance is the diameter of the nozzle.  Here the Stokes number is calculated,

References

Further reading
 
 
 
 

Discrete-phase flow
Aerosols
Dimensionless numbers of fluid mechanics
Fluid dynamics